Zhengzhou BRT Route B1 is a bus rapid transit route operated by Zhengzhou Bus. The route is the first ever route with dedicated bus lanes in Zhengzhou BRT.

History
The route was officially commenced on 28 May 2009, together with 8 other feeder routes. The route was initially a loop line running on Nongye Road, Zhongzhou Avenue, Weilai Road, Hanghai Road and Tongbai Road.

Due to the construction of Zhengzhou Metro Line 5 on Hanghai Road and Tongbai Road and the construction of Nongye Expressway above Nongye Road, most platforms of the route on these three roads have been removed. Currently, services of the route on Nongye Road has been suspended.

Route

The route is U-shaped, running on Zhongzhou Avenue, Weilai Road, Hanghai Road, Tongbai Road, Wulongkou S. Road and Dianchang Road, with the eastern terminus at Zhongzhou Avenue and Nongye Road and the western terminus at Dianchang Road B/T.

Branch routes
The route has a number of branch routes, which are free-interchangeable with the main route.

B10: Kunlun Road and Longhai Road ↔ Fogang B/T
B12: Zhengzhou railway station (North Terminus) ↔ Lamei Road B/T
B13: Dianchang Road B/T ↔ Kunlun Road and Ruhe Road
B15: North 3rd Ring Road and Zhongzhou Avenue ↔ Shihua Road B/T
B16: Shangwu Inner Ring Road and Shangwu E. 1st Street ↔ Ganjiang Road B/T
B17: Zhengzhou railway station (South Terminus) ↔ Jingkai 8th Avenue B/T
B18: Gaocun (Wenhua Road) ↔ Minsheng E. Street and Zhengguang Road
B19: Liuzhuang (Huayuan Road) ↔ Convention and Exhibition Center (Inner Ring)
B21: Zhengzhou railway station (Yima Road) ↔ Qinhe Road and West 3rd Ring Road
B25: Zhengzhou East railway station ↔ Zhongzhou Avenue and Nongye Road
B38: North 3rd Ring Road and Shakou Road ↔ Zhengzhou East railway station
B53: Zhengzhou Bus Company ↔ Wenhua Road and Sanquan Road (N)
263: Huayuankou B/T ↔ Zhengzhou No.7 People's Hospital

Fleet

Former
Yutong ZK6180HGC (18m)
Yutong ZK6180CHEVG1 (18m)

Current
Yutong U12 (12m)
Yutong ZK6125CHEVNPG4 (12m)
Yutong ZK6180CHEVNPG3 (18m)

References

Bus Routes in Zhengzhou
Zhengzhou BRT